Jan Zawiejski, born Jan Baptysta Feintuch, (born 20 June 1854, Kraków – died 9 September 1922, Kraków) was a Polish architect from an assimilated Polish-Jewish family, a representative of the 19th-century historicism advocating for a return to classical design of the past.

Life and work
Zawiejski was born on 20 June 1854 in Kraków, located at that time in the Austrian partition. He came from a wealthy Jewish Feintuch family. In 1846, the Feintuch family accepted baptism at the Evangelical St. Martin's Church. In the years of 1872–1873, he studied at the Technical University of Munich and between 1873–1878 at the Polytechnic in Vienna. In 1900, he became the city architect of Kraków and held that position until 1914. He worked as professor at the Kraków School of Commerce (Krakowska Szkoła Przemysłowa) and collaborated with the Architekt and Nowa Reforma magazines.

His most notable design works in Kraków include Juliusz Słowacki Theatre (1889-1893), School of Economics (1904–1906), Ohrenstein House at the corner of Stradom and Dietla streets build for Moshe Löbel Ohrenstein and his wife Reizel Wald (1911–1913), Turnaus' Townhouse at the corner of Siemiradzki and Łobzowska Streets (1889–1891) and the architect's own house, the so-called Jasny Dom (The Bright House) built 1909–1910. He also designed the old Spa House (Pol. "Stary Dom Zdrojowy") in Krynica (1884–1889; with Jan Niedzielski). Between 190-1013, he supervised the reconstruction of the Wielopolski Palace, seat of the Kraków City Council.

Zawiejski died on 9 September 1922 in Kraków. He is interred in the Rakowicki Cemetery.

Gallery

See also
History of Kraków

References

Further reading
 

1854 births
1922 deaths
Architects from Kraków
19th-century Polish architects
20th-century Polish architects